The Men's 10 metre platform competition at the 2017 World Championships was held on 21 and 22 July 2017.

Results
The preliminary round was started on 21 July at 10:00. The semifinal was held on 21 July at 15:30. The final was held on 22 July at 17:00.

Green denotes finalists

Blue denotes semifinalists

References

Men's 10 metre platform